

Champions
First World's Championship Series: Providence Grays over New York Metropolitans (3–0)
National League: Providence Grays
American Association: New York Metropolitans
Union Association: St. Louis Maroons

Major league baseball final standings

National League final standings

American Association final standings

Union Association final standings

Statistical leaders

National League statistical leaders

American Association statistical leaders

Union Association statistical leaders

All-Time Statistical Leaders (Strikeouts)

The 1884 season was memorable in that six of the top 10 all-time Major League Baseball single season strikeout totals were set that season:

Notable seasons
Old Hoss Radbourn won a record 59 or 60 games (depending on the sources), a record that will almost certainly never be broken. In addition to wins, Radbourn led the National League in games (75), games started (73), complete games (73), ERA (1.38), saves (2), strikeouts (441), and innings pitched (678.2).

The season record for pitching strikeouts (369, by Tim Keefe 1883) is broken by seven players, with Hugh Daily beating Keefe's record by 114. To this day (as of 2020), six of the top ten strikeout seasons were accomplished in 1884 (including five of the top seven). 1884 was the first season in which pitchers were allowed to throw overhand.

Events

January–March
February 18 – Terry Larkin, recently released from prison after shooting his wife and a police officer in 1883, is arrested again for threatening to shoot his father. Larkin will be released and play this season for the Richmond Virginians. Larkin was later institutionalized after challenging his former employer to a duel, and committed suicide by slitting his throat with a razor in 1894.
February 20 – The Altoona Mountain City club is admitted to the new Union Association as its seventh club, leaving Lancaster as the only franchise in the Inter-State League.
March 4 – The National League reduces the number of balls needed for a walk to six.  Team owners also agree to provide two separate benches for the teams in order to cut down on player fraternizing during games.
March 15 – Henry Chadwick writes in a newspaper column that a ground-keeper in St. Louis has started placing tarpaulins over the bases when it rains in order to keep them dry.  Other clubs will follow suit and cover the pitching area and batter areas as well.
March 17 – The Union Association admits the Boston Reds, run by George Wright, as a new team to the league.
March 28 – Umpire William McLean throws a bat into the stands, striking a spectator, in reaction to taunts from the crowd.  McLean is arrested but not charged as the fan is not injured.

April–June
April 17 – The Union Association opens its inaugural season with 3 games.
May 1 – Moses Fleetwood Walker becomes the first black player to play in the major leagues. Walker will play in 42 games for the Toledo Blue Stockings, have 152 at-bats and get 40 hits in his only season in major league baseball. Facing racism constantly, even his own teammates refuse to play with him. An injury in mid-July effectively ends Walker's season and he is later released.  No other African-American will play in the major leagues until Jackie Robinson in 1947.
May 1 – The Cincinnati Red Stockings of the American Association has a section of their stands collapse as fans are leaving the park following their opening day game.  There are numerous injuries including a broken arm. Reds' ownership covered all medical expenses for those injured.
May 5 – After pitching in St. Louis the previous day, Tony Mullane of the Toledo Blue Stockings is barred by a court from pitching in the state of Missouri until his case involving his contract jumping is settled.
May 6 – Larry McKeon of the Indianapolis Hoosiers pitches a 6 inning no-hitter. The game is called due to rain with the score tied 0–0. McKeon will go on to lose 41 games in 1884.
May 16 – A foul tip off the bat of a Detroit Wolverines player sticks in the face mask of Boston Beaneaters catcher Mike Hines.  Umpire Van Court rules it a catch and calls the batter out.  National League secretary Nicholas Young will instruct all NL umpires to not call an out in that scenario again.
May 22 - The Indianapolis Hoosiers release catcher George Mundinger and pitcher Pete Fries.
May 24 – Al Atkinson of the Philadelphia Athletics retires the final 27 batters in pitching a no-hitter over the Pittsburgh Alleghenys.  Atkinson hit the lead off batter, Ed Swartwood, who stole second, moved to third on a ground out and scored on a wild pitch, then did not allow another base runner in the 10–1 victory.
May 24 – The St. Louis Maroons of the Union Association, after starting the season with 20 consecutive wins, lose their first game of the year.
May 29 – Ed Morris of the Columbus Buckeyes pitches a no-hitter against the Pittsburgh Alleghenys in an American Association game.
May 29 – The Chicago White Stockings hit 5 over-the-fence home runs in their home opener against the Detroit Wolverines.  The White Stockings new ground rule allows a home run instead of a double for any ball hit in the air over the 180' left field fence or the 215' right field fence.  After Chicago increases their home run output from 13 in 1883 to 142 this season, the National League will mandate a minimum fence distance of 210 feet beginning in 1885.
May 30 – Ned Williamson of the Chicago White Stockings becomes the first player to hit 3 home runs in one game in Chicago's 12–2 win over the Detroit Wolverines.
May 31 – Altoona Mountain City drops out of the Union Association and folds, being replaced by the Kansas City Cowboys. Teams leaving and entering will become a recurring theme during the UA's one and only season.
June 5 – Frank Mountain of the Columbus Buckeyes pitches a no-hitter and hits a home run in a 12–0 victory.
June 7 – Charlie Sweeney of the Providence Grays strikes out 19 batters in a game to set a record that will last for over 100 years.
June 10 – Larry Corcoran of the Chicago White Stockings switch-pitches in a 2–0 win over the Cleveland Blues.
June 13 – The Baltimore Orioles place a barbed-wire fence around the field after the crowd swarmed the field and threatened the umpire in the previous day's game.
June 16 – Buffalo Bisons outfielder Jim O'Rourke hits for the cycle as the Bisons crush the Chicago White Stockings, 20–9.
June 20 - The Toledo Blue Stockings sign catcher Deacon McGuire. 
June 27 – Larry Corcoran of the Chicago White Stockings throws a no-hitter against the Providence Grays. It is the 3rd no-hitter of Corcoran's career and the first in the National League this season.
June 28 – While playing a Sunday game in Toledo, the players are arrested in the 6th inning for violating the city ordinance banning Sunday baseball.  Due to the unruly crowd, the police allow the players to complete the game.  The Brooklyn Atlantics defeat Toledo 5–3 before players from both teams are taken into custody.

July–September
 1884 – In American Association action, Guy Hecker of the Louisville Eclipse pitches complete games to win both ends of a doubleheader. Hecker does not walk a single batter in this day as he beats the Brooklyn Atlantics, 5–4 and 8–2.
July 5 – Al Atkinson jumps from the American Association Philadelphia Athletics to the Union Association Chicago Browns, the first player to jump mid-season to the new league.
July 7 – Hugh Daily strikes out 19, tying the record set a month earlier while throwing a one-hitter in the process.
July 10 – Hugh Daily of the Chicago Browns pitches his second consecutive one-hitter. Daily will pitch four one-hitters by season's end, setting a major league record.
July 11 – Billy Taylor, who had a 25–4 record for the St. Louis Maroons in the Union Association, jumps to the Philadelphia Athletics of the American Association and wins the first of 17 games for Philadelphia, ending with a combined 43–16 record.
July 28 – Charles Radbourn gains a victory in relief for the Providence Grays in the game that provides the point of contention as to whether Radbourn won 59 games or 60 in 1884. The Grays were trailing 4–3 when starting pitcher Cyclone Miller finished pitching in the bottom of the 5th inning. Providence scored 4 runs in the top of the 6th to take the lead, then Radbourn came in to pitch starting in the bottom of the 6th. Under the scoring rules of the day, Radbourn was credited with the win. Miller would have gotten the victory under today's scoring rules, hence the discrepancy in total wins for Radbourn.
August 4 – Pud Galvin of the Buffalo Bisons pitches a no-hitter against the Detroit Wolverines.
August 5 – Thomas Lynch, a deaf-mute, makes his major league debut for the Chicago White Stockings in the pitcher's box and is winning until he tires in the eighth inning.  Cap Anson, who had hit two homers in the game, relieves him and promptly loses 8–5.  Lynch will never appear in another major league game.
August 6 – Cap Anson hits three home runs in a 13–4 win, giving him five homers in his last two games.
August 21 – Charlie Geggus pitches a no-hitter for the Washington Nationals of the Union Association.  The game is halted after eight innings as the Nationals defeat the Wilmington Quicksteps 12–1.
August 25 – The Chicago Browns of the Union Association, after losing $15,000 in Chicago, move to Pittsburgh and become the Pittsburgh Stogies.  They defeated the first-place St. Louis Maroons in their first official game in Pittsburgh on this day.
August 26 – Dick Burns of the Cincinnati Outlaw Reds pitches a no-hitter against the Kansas City Cowboys.
August 28 – Mickey Welch strikes out the first 9 batters of the game to set a record that would not be broken until 1970 by Tom Seaver.
August 29 – The St. Louis Maroons win the only Union Association pennant with a 7–2 win over the Pittsburgh Stogies.
September 11 – When no umpire shows up for the American Association game between the Philadelphia Athletics and the Toledo Blue Stockings, rookie pitcher Hank O'Day of Toledo fills in as a substitute.  After his playing career, O'Day would later be recognized as the best umpire of the first quarter of the 20th century and would be the umpire to make the famous call involving Fred Merkle in 1908.
September 15 – Manager Joe Simmons of the Wilmington Quicksteps pulls his team off the field before a home game against the Kansas City Cowboys when he realizes he will be unable to pay the required $60 gate fee to the visiting Cowboys as the attendance is zero. The visiting Cowboys are 7–55–2 (.112) while the Quicksteps are 2–16 (.111) and occupy the cellar in the Union Association standings; following this, the Quicksteps drop out of the Association and disband.
September 15 – The Providence Grays win the National League pennant with a 10–2 win over the Cleveland Blues.
September 19 – The Union Association replaces the Wilmington Quicksteps and Pittsburgh Stogies and with the Milwaukee Brewers and a team from Omaha sponsored by the Union Pacific Railroad.
September 27 – Before playing a single game in the Union Association, Omaha is replaced by the St. Paul Saints.
September 28 – Ed Cushman of the Milwaukee Brewers pitches a no-hitter in the Brewer's 2nd game in the Union Association.
September 29 - Moses Fleetwood Walker, the first African-American to play in the major leagues, is released by the Toledo Blue Stockings. Walker never again played in the major leagues and the color barrier would not be broken for over sixty years.

October–December
October 1 – Charlie Getzien of the Detroit Wolverines pitches a no-hitter in a game called after 6 innings as Detroit wins 1–0.
October 1 – The New York Metropolitans clinch the American Association pennant with a 4–1 victory over the Columbus Buckeyes.
October 3 – Henry Porter playing for the Milwaukee Brewers of the Union Association strikes out 18 batters in one game against the Boston Reds, a record that stood until broken by Steve Carlton in 1969.
October 4 – In his first start since his no-hitter on September 28, Ed Cushman takes another no-hitter into the 9th inning only to give up a bloop single and finish with a 1-hitter.
October 4 – Sam Kimber of the Brooklyn Atlantics pitches a 10 inning no-hitter that ends in a 0–0 tie after the game is called because of darkness.
October 5 – Charlie Sweeney and Henry Boyle of the St. Louis Maroons combine on a 5 inning no-hitter when the game is called on account of rain.  Despite the no-hitter, the Maroons lose 1–0 when 2 errors allow the only run of the game.
October 9 – Jack Manning only hits 14 career home runs in a career that spans 12 seasons and over 800 games, but he hits 3 out on this day at the Chicago White Stockings cozy Lake Front Park.
October 23 – The Providence Grays, champions of the National League, behind the pitching of Charley Radbourn, defeat the American Association champion New York Metropolitans 6–0 at the Polo Grounds in New York City.
October 24 – The Providence Grays take the 2nd game of the best of 3 series against the New York Metropolitans by a score of 3–1.  The game at the Polo Grounds is called after 7 innings because of darkness.
October 25 – The Providence Grays complete the sweep of the New York Metropolitans with a 12–2 win in a game called after 6 innings because of extreme cold and an attendance of only 300 at the Polo Grounds.  Charley Radbourn, after winning 59 games during the regular season, wins all 3 games for Providence while allowing no earned runs.
October 30 – The Columbus Buckeyes of the American Association sell their players to the Pittsburgh Alleghenys for $6,000 and disband the team.
November 4 – Tony Mullane signs a contract with the Cincinnati Red Stockings for the 1885 season, in direct conflict with his prior oral agreement to play for the St. Louis Browns.  The American Association will suspend Mullane for the entire 1885 season because of this and previous contract troubles, but allow him to remain the property of Cincinnati.
November 19 – National League president A. G. Mills resigns and league secretary Nick Young replaces him.
November 20 – The National League votes to allow overhand pitching for the 1885 season, although there are restrictions placed on the delivery in order to keep velocity down. In addition, teams are now required to supply a separate bench for each club at their park to limit inter-team fraternization.
December 11 – The American Association votes to continue their ban on overhand pitching.
December 18 – The Union Association has only four teams in attendance at their winter meetings. The UA will officially fold in early 1885.

Births

January–April
January 1 – Tom Downey
January 4 – Al Bridwell
January 26 – Tubby Spencer
February 1 – Joe Connolly
February 1 – Rosey Rowswell 
February 1 – Candy Jim Taylor
February 10 – Billy Evans
February 14 – Jack Lewis
February 25 – Bob Bescher
March 4 – Red Murray
March 7 – Sam Bennett
March 7 – Ed Willett
March 19 – Clyde Engle
March 21 – Mysterious Walker
March 31 – Frank Truesdale
April 6 – Rudy Schwenck
April 7 – Jake Daubert
April 20 – Mike Mowrey
April 25 – John Henry "Pop" Lloyd

May–August
May 5 – Chief Bender
May 13 – Bert Niehoff
May 16 – Peter McLaughlin
May 20 – Paul Howard
May 26 – Jimmy Lavender
May 30 – Rube Oldring
June 7 – George Moriarty
June 12 – Otto Knabe
June 16 – Bob Peterson
June 19 – Eddie Cicotte
June 23 – Dick Egan
July 4 – Jack Warhop
August 6 – Sherry Magee
August 6 – Joe Birmingham

September–December
September 7 – Earl Moseley *
September 14 - Willie Hogan
September 22 – Grover Land
September 30 – Nap Rucker
October 18 – Burt Shotton
October 28 – Chet Chadbourne
November 3 – Charley Stis
November 15 – Red Kelly
November 24 – Tullie McAdoo
December 1 – Charley Moore
December 4 – Biff Schlitzer
December 5 – Ed Summers
December 10 – Art Griggs
December 15 – Jim Nealon
December 31 – Bobby Byrne

 * Some sources show 1887

Deaths
March 16 – Art Croft, 29, first baseman and left fielder for 1877 St. Lous and 1878 Indianapolis teams.
July 11 – Bill Smiley, 28?, utility player who played mainly in 1882.
September 26 – Jim Egan, 26?, pitcher for the 1882 Troy Trojans.
November 13 – Bill Sullivan, 31, played in 2 games for the 1878 Chicago White Stockings.

References

External links
1884 National League season at Baseball-Reference.com
1884 American Association season at Baseball-Reference.com
1884 Union Association season at Baseball-Reference.com
Charlton's Baseball Chronology at BaseballLibrary.com
Year by Year History at Baseball-Almanac.com
Retrosheet.org
Delaware's Baseball History on Russ Pickett.com
SABR biography on Ted Kennedy